Nagen Neog (died 6 May 1996) was an Indian politician from the state of Assam. He served as Member of Assam Legislative Assembly for Golgahat and as Rural Development Minister in the Hiteswar Saikia Cabinet until his assassination. He was the husband of the current Finance minister of Assam, Ajanta Neog, and son in law of MLA Rebati Das.

Political career 
Neog was the Indian National Congress candidate for the constituency of Golaghat in the 1983 Assam Legislative Assembly election. He received 2222 votes, 89.34% of the total vote and won the seat, defeating his nearest opponent by 2063 votes. He lost in the 1985 Assam Legislative Assembly election. He was again the Indian National Congress candidate for Golaghat in 1991, he received 27222 votes, 38.82% of the total vote and became MLA again. He became Rural Development Minister in the Hiteswar Saikia cabinet.

Death 
On 6 May 1996, 2 days after the 1996 Assam Legislative Assembly Election, Neog was returning home in Baruagaon,15 kilometres from the District Headquarter town of Golaghat. Neog, with 8 people including his driver and 5 bodyguards were all killed. The accused killers served time in prison but were later acquitted in 2013 on grounds of lack of sufficient evidence.

References 

Assam MLAs 1991–1996
Assam MLAs 1983–1985
1996 deaths
Assam politicians
Indian National Congress politicians from Assam